Last Days of Wonder is the seventh studio album released by The Handsome Family. It was released 2006 by Carrot Top Records (North America) / Loose Music (Europe). The title is a reference to Puritan scientist and witch-hunter Cotton Mather's 1693 book Wonders of the Invisible World, which lyricist Rennie Sparks found intriguing because of what she called its "madness brimming under the surface of things."

Reception
The album was well received by critics: according to Metacritic, the album has received an average review score of 80/100, based on 17 reviews, indicating "generally favorable reviews."

Track listing
 "Your Great Journey" – 3:13
 "Tesla's Hotel Room" – 3:56
 "These Golden Jewels" – 3:32
 "After We Shot The Grizzly" – 3:33
 "Flapping Your Broken Wings" – 3:45
 "Beautiful William" – 4:22
 "All The Time In Airports" – 3:43
 "White Lights" – 3:36
 "Bowling Alley Bar" – 2:52
 "Hunter Green" - 4:29
 "Our Blue Sky" - 2:59
 "Somewhere Else To Be" - 3:23

Personnel
The Handsome Family
 Rennie Sparks - lyrics; artwork; some autoharp, banjo, ukulele, vocals
 Brett Sparks - music; all instruments except as follows
with:
 David Coulter - saw on "These Golden Jewels"
 Stephen Dorocke - pedal steel on "Your Great Journey" and "Somewhere Else to Be"
 David Gutierrez - jazz guitar on "After We Shot the Grizzly"
 Eric Johnson - banjo on "After We Shot the Grizzly"
 Darrel Sparks - harmony vocals on "All The Time in Airports", "Our Blue Sky" and "Your Great Journey"
 Mark Weaver - trombone on "Tesla's Hotel Room"
 Amanda Kooser - 12-string guitar on "Our Blue Sky"
Technical
 Mastered by Roger Seibel/SAE - mastering
Johanna Nelson - back cover photo (https://www.flickr.com/photos/girlfromauntie).
 Sheila Sachs - layout assistance

References

External links
The Handsome Family official website

2006 albums
The Handsome Family albums
Carrot Top Records albums
Loose Music albums